A list of fictional butlers or related characters:

See also
 List of famous fictional valets

References

Lists of fictional characters by occupation